Roßberg is a German name for a hill or mountain and may refer to:

 Roßberg (Black Forest) (1,124.7 m), mountain in the Black Forest, Baden-Württemberg, Germany
 Roßberg (Haardt) (637 m), third highest mountain in the Palatine Forest, Rhineland-Palatinate, Germany
 Roßberg (Swabian Jura) (869 m), a mountain in the Swabian Jura, Baden-Württemberg, Germany
 Roßberg (Hinterland) (497.1 m), a hill in the Gladenbach Uplands, Hesse, Germany